"You Never Miss a Real Good Thing (Till He Says Goodbye)" is a song written by Bob McDill, and recorded by American country music artist Crystal Gayle.  It was released in October 1976 as the second single from the album Crystal.  The song was Gayle's second number one song on the country chart.  The single stayed at number one for one week and spent twelve weeks on the country chart.

Chart performance

References

External links
 

1976 singles
Crystal Gayle songs
Songs written by Bob McDill
Song recordings produced by Allen Reynolds
United Artists Records singles
1976 songs